Jennie is a novel by American author Douglas Preston. The book was published on October 1, 1994 by St. Martin's Press .

Plot summary
Jennie is a chimpanzee, living in the 1970s. Naturalist Dr. Hugo Archibald delivers Jennie from her dying mother in the Cameroons and brings her home to his American family. His young son, Sandy, becomes extremely attached to Jennie, but Archibald's daughter, Sarah, resents the chimp. Jennie, through her learning of ASL (American Sign Language), starts to converse and interact with the humans around her. Eventually, Jennie goes to a wildlife preserve where she cannot function.

Reception

—Review by Kirkus Reviews

References

1994 American novels
American adventure novels
American science fiction novels
Novels by Douglas Preston
American thriller novels
Fiction set in the 1970s
Novels about animals